Below is a list of notable Java programming language technologies (frameworks, libraries)

Java (programming language) libraries
Libraries